Sir William Goodenough Hayter, 1st Baronet, PC, QC (28 January 1792 – 26 December 1878) was a British barrister and Whig politician. He is best remembered for his two tenures as Parliamentary Secretary to the Treasury (government chief whip) between 1850 and 1852 and 1853 and 1858.

Background and education
Born at Winterbourne Stoke, Wiltshire, Hayter was the youngest son of John Hayter and Grace, daughter of Stephen Goodenough, of Codford, Wiltshire. He entered  Winchester College in 1804 and matriculated at Trinity College, Oxford, on 24 October 1810, taking his BA in 1814.

Legal career
Hayter was called to the Bar, Lincoln's Inn, on 23 November 1819, and became an equity draftsman and conveyancer. He attended the Wiltshire sessions, but retired from practice on being made a Queen's Counsel on 21 Feb 1839. He was, however, bencher of his inn on 15 April 1839, and treasurer in 1853.

Political career
On 24 July 1837 Hayter was returned to parliament for Wells, and sat for that constituency till 6 July 1865. In 1839 he voted for the repeal of the Corn Laws alongside Charles Pelham Villiers, and was present at all the divisions in favour of free trade. He served under Lord John Russell as Judge Advocate General from 30 December 1847 to 30 May 1849, when he was made Financial Secretary to the Treasury. In July 1850 he was appointed Parliamentary Secretary to the Treasury (chief government whip) by Russell, a post he held until March 1852, and again under Lord Aberdeen and Lord Palmerston from December 1852 to March 1858. The Dictionary of National Biography states that "When Lord Derby came into power in 1852, Hayter marshalled the disorderly ranks of the liberal party with great success, and in the following governments of Lord Aberdeen and Lord Palmerston his powers developed, and his reputation steadily increased".

Hayter was sworn of the Privy Council on 11 February 1848 and created a Baronet, of South Hill Park in the County of Berkshire, on 19 April 1858. Three years later, on 27 February 1861, he was presented by Lord Palmerston and 365 members of the House of Commons with a service of plate at a banquet in Willis's Rooms, according to the Dictionary of National Biography "in remembrance of the courtesy, fairness, and efficiency with which he had discharged his duties for many years as liberal 'whip'".

Hayter was not a frequent speaker in parliament, but took part in debates on matters within his knowledge. He was a member of the committee in Lord Denman's inquiry into the management of the woods and forests, as well as chairman of the committee on Feargus O'Connor's land scheme.

Apart from his political and legal career Hayter was involved in farming. According to the Dictionary of National Biography, "his farm, Lindsay, near Leighton, Buckinghamshire, was kept in the highest state of cultivation, and was a model of economy and profitable management". He was also a member of the council of the Agricultural Society from its start in 1838.

Family
Hayter married Anne, eldest daughter of William Pulsford, of Linslade, Buckinghamshire, on 18 August 1832. During 1878 he fell into a depressed state of mind, and on 26 December was found drowned in a small lake in the grounds of his residence, South Hill Park, Easthampstead, Berkshire, aged 86. He was buried at Easthampstead on 2 January 1879 and was succeeded in the baronetcy by his only son Arthur, who was elevated to the peerage as Baron Haversham in 1906. Lady Hayter died in London on 2 June 1889, aged 82.

References

External links 
 

1792 births
1878 deaths
Baronets in the Baronetage of the United Kingdom
People from Wiltshire
People educated at Winchester College
Alumni of Trinity College, Oxford
Members of Lincoln's Inn
Members of the Parliament of the United Kingdom for English constituencies
Whig (British political party) MPs
Members of the Privy Council of the United Kingdom
UK MPs 1837–1841
UK MPs 1841–1847
UK MPs 1847–1852
UK MPs 1852–1857
UK MPs 1857–1859
UK MPs 1859–1865